Aleksandr Vyacheslavovich Golubev (born 19 May 1972 in Karavaievo, Kostroma Oblast) is a former Russian speed skater. Very surprisingly he came to the top in the 500 m in Vikingskipet at the 1994 Winter Olympics in Lillehammer. He didn't place in the top three in any other international championship after that. He stands with one individual victory on 500 m in the World Cup from 1993.

External links
 
 

1972 births
Russian male speed skaters
Olympic gold medalists for Russia
Olympic speed skaters of Russia
Olympic speed skaters of the Unified Team
Speed skaters at the 1992 Winter Olympics
Speed skaters at the 1994 Winter Olympics
Speed skaters at the 1998 Winter Olympics
Living people
People from Kostroma
Olympic medalists in speed skating
Medalists at the 1994 Winter Olympics
Sportspeople from Kostroma Oblast